Pierre Rehov is the pseudonym of a French–Israeli documentary filmmaker, director and novelist, most known for his movies about the Arab–Israeli conflict and Israeli–Palestinian conflict, its treatment in the media, and about terrorism. Rehov is also a fiction writer, whose novels have enjoyed some success in France, and several have been translated into English and German.

Life
Rehov was born to a Jewish family from Algiers, when Algeria was still a French department. He experienced terrorism at a young age when his school was the target of a terror attack conducted by the "FLN" (Algerian National Front of "Liberation"). In 1961, his family became a part of pied-noirs (Non-Muslim inhabitants of Algeria) fleeing from Algeria in fear of massacres. (A purge in Algeria led to the massacre of close to 200,000 people). A later film on Jewish refugees (Silent Exodus) described the fate of Jews who were expelled from or fled Muslim countries between 1948 and 1974. He chose not to describe his own community from Algeria, since the Algerian war was a colonial problem involving France more than the Jewish community, although he recalls that Jews in Algeria had been suffering from Muslim antisemitism for centuries, before Algeria was part of France.

Rehov says he was not any sort of activist until he saw the death of Muhammad al-Durrah on television, and doubted its authenticity.
He was the first to conduct a journalistic investigation into the murder of al-Durrah whom he still believes was the victim of the Palestinian propaganda machine. It was later demonstrated in a French court that Al Durah could not have been killed by Israeli soldiers.

Rehov claims that every reporter must be (or appear to be) pro-Palestinian to work in the Palestinian territories safely and this, among other things, creates systematic anti-Israeli bias, especially on French media outlets. He advocates a two-state solution, for Palestinians and Israelis to live side by side, but does not believe that peace will be possible for many generations. He puts the blame on the Palestinian Authority and Hamas, that would have no interest in solving the conflict through negocations since the United Nations and the European Union are biased against Israel.

In January 2008, Rehov was embedded in the 4/1 US cavalry in Baghdad and Durah, where he filmed hours of dailies, showing the situation in Iraq from the field. Those images are part of his documentary The Path to Darkness.

In 2008 Rehov moved to the United States due to what he described as a growing climate of antisemitism in France and the rest of Europe. Three years later, in November 2011, he moved to Tel Aviv, Israel, where he now lives.

As a journalist and commentator, he writes regulartly in Le Figaro, Valeurs Actuelle, The Gatestone Institute, The Jerusalem Post and many political blogs, including Dreuz and Atlantico. 

Rehov is married to Sharon Yambem, a Jewish immigrant to Israel from India. From a previous mariage he has a son, who lives in Singapore and a daughter who is an actrice and lives in New York. A third child was born in 2022 from his second marriage.

Filmography
 The Road to Jenin – a response to Jenin, Jenin, a controversial documentary produced by Mohammed Bakri, in order to portray what Bakri calls "the Palestinian truth" about the "Battle of Jenin". The film lists number of casualties acknowledged by both Palestinians and Israelis.
 The Trojan Horse – this film demonstrates that Yasser Arafat's true intentions were not a two-state solution, but a Palestinian state on the territory of all of Israel.
 Holy Land - Christians in Peril – a film which exposes the flight of Christians from PA-controlled lands.
 Silent Exodus – a film about the Jewish exodus from Arab lands.
 Hostages of Hatred – how the Palestinian right of return, supported by the UN, has left Palestinians in camps for half a century and, as Rehov argues, originated the present unsolvable situation in the Middle East.
 From The River to the Sea was voted Best Film at the 2006 Liberty Film Festival
 The War of Images
 Suicide Killers – 2006 documentary film that purports to explore the psychological condition of suicide bombers. Released in theaters, in New York and Los Angeles, and distributed on DVD by WEA, Suicide Killers was considered for the Hollywood Oscars but not nominated.
 First comes Saturday, then Comes Sunday – 2007 documentary film about the persecution of Christians under Islamic rule in the Middle East
 The Path to Darkness – 2011
 War Crimes in Gaza – 2015
 Beyond Deception Strategy – 2015 
 Unveiling Jerusalem – 2017 
 Behind the smokescreen" - 2018
 Pay for Slay - 2019
 Palestinian Apartheid - 2019
 The origins of the Palestinian Cause - 2019
 Terror, racket and corruption - 2019
 Palestine, the invention of a Nation - 2019
 The Sunday People - 2019
 Palestinian animal abuse - 2019
 Violence and discrimination - 2020
 Lies and tears (A counter investigation into Shireen Abu Akleh's death)
Note: most his films are available on Vimeo

Novels
 Cellules Blanches – Published by the major French publisher, Albin Michel. Published in Germany under the title Wesse Zellen and in English under the title "Beyond Red Lines". Soon to be published in Spanish and Italian. A thriller about counter-terrorism.
 Tu seras si jolie - Published by Belfond. June 2018
 Ted - Published by "La Mécanique Générale". January 2019
 Beyond red lines - Published by "Thirty Trees". March 2020
 The Third Testament - Published by "Thirty Trees". July 2021
 88 - Published by "Cosmopolis". February 2021
 Amnesia - Published by "Cosmopolis". March 2022
 Red Eden - Publishe by Thirty Trees. May 2022
 Nuit Américaine - Published by Cosmopolis. September 2022

See also
 Media coverage of the Arab–Israeli conflict
 Pallywood

External links
  and official studio website
 Pierre Rehov's profile on IMDb
 Writings by Pierre Rehov at the Gatestone Institute
 
 Pierre Rehov in the Jerusalem Post
 Pierre Rehov in Le Figaro
 Author profile on Goodreads
 Autor profile on Amazon

References

Israeli documentary filmmakers
French documentary filmmakers
Living people
French male writers
1952 births
Algerian Jews
People from Algiers
French male novelists